Daya (pronunciation: , meaning compassion) is a fundamental teaching of the Sikh religion and teachings can be found on Daya. The other four qualities are truth (sat), contentment (santokh), humility (nimrata) and love (pyaar). These five qualities are essential to a Sikh and it is their duty to meditate and recite the Gurbani so that these virtues become a part of their mind.

The importance of Daya can be seen from the following Shabads from Guru Granth Sahib:

This concept says to not ignore tragedies that take place in the world but to face them head-on and do whatever is possible within one's means. As a Sikh one must feel the pain and suffering of other people involved in any tragedy.

Daya in Sikhism
 (usually spelt daia in Punjabi), from Sanskrit "daya" meaning "to sympathize with, to have pity on, stands for compassion, sympathy".  It means ‘suffering in the suffering of all others’.  It is deeper and more positive in sentiment than sympathy.  , cognitively, observes alien pain; affectively, it gets touched by it and moves with affectional responses for the sufferer; and cognitively it moves one to act mercifully, pityingly, with kindness and forgiveness. One imbued with  “chooses to die himself rather than cause other people to die,” says Guru Nanak (GG, 356).

 is a divine quality and a moral virtue highly prized in all religious traditions.  In the Sikh Scripture,  (super compassionate),  (lord of compassion),  (merciful god),  (the merciful one), etc., have been used as attributive names of God (GG, 249, 991, 1027, 727).  In Sikh ethics, too,  is inter alia, a basic moral requirement, a moral vow.  “Keep your heart content and cherish compassion for others; this way alone can your holy vow be fulfilled” (GG 299).

At the human level, one can comprehend feeling of another's anguish, but as a theological doctrine it is to risk allowing suffering in God's life.  This has often caused much controversy in theological circles.  God does not suffer in the sense of pain from evil as evil, but may suffer compassion as bearing the pain of others to relieve them (of pain as also of evil).  That is why at the time of Babar's invasion of India, Guru Nanak, when he witnessed the suffering of people, complained to God:

Daya is a virtue of the mind.

In Sikh thought  is considered the highest virtue:

Bibliography 

1.	Sher Singh, The Philosophy of Sikhism.  Lahore, 1944

2.	Nripinder Singh, The Sikh Moral Tradition.  Delhi, 1990

3.	Avtar Singh, Ethics of the Sikhs.  Patiala, 1970.	

Above adapted from article By J. S. Neki

 Concepts In Sikhism - Edited by Dr. Surinder Singh Sodhi

Sikh terminology